In the teaching of the Catholic Church, an indulgence (from , 'permit') is "a way to reduce the amount of punishment one has to undergo for sins". The Catechism of the Catholic Church describes an indulgence as "a remission before God of the temporal punishment due to sins whose guilt has already been forgiven, which the faithful Christian who is duly disposed gains under certain prescribed conditions through the action of the Church which, as the minister of redemption, dispenses and applies with authority the treasury of the satisfactions of Christ and all of the saints".

The recipient of an indulgence must perform an action to receive it. This is most often the saying (once, or many times) of a specified prayer, but may also include a pilgrimage, the visiting of a particular place (such as a shrine, church or cemetery) or the performance of specific good works.

Indulgences were introduced to allow for the remission of the severe penances of the early church and granted at the intercession of Christians awaiting martyrdom or at least imprisoned for the faith. The church teaches that indulgences draw on the treasury of merit accumulated by Jesus' superabundantly meritorious sacrifice on the cross and the virtues and penances of the saints. They are granted for specific good works and prayers in proportion to the devotion with which those good works are performed or prayers recited.

By the late Middle Ages, indulgences were used to support charities for the public good including hospitals. However, the abuse of indulgences, mainly through commercialization, had become a serious problem which the church recognized but was unable to restrain effectively. Indulgences were, from the beginning of the Protestant Reformation, a target of attacks by Martin Luther and other Protestant theologians. Eventually the Catholic Counter-Reformation curbed the abuses of indulgences, but indulgences continue to play a role in modern Catholic religious life, and were dogmatically confirmed as part of the Catholic faith by the Council of Trent. Reforms in the 20th century largely abolished the quantification of indulgences, which had been expressed in terms of days or years. These days or years were meant to represent the equivalent of time spent in penance, although it was widely mistaken to mean time spent in Purgatory. The reforms also greatly reduced the number of indulgences granted for visiting particular churches and other locations.

Catholic teaching

Catholic teaching states that when a person sins, they acquire the liability of guilt and the liability of punishment. A mortal sin (one that is grave or serious in nature and is committed knowingly and freely) is considered to be an active refusal of communion with God, and to separate a person from him to the end of suffering the eternal death of hell as an effect of this rejection, a consequence known as the "eternal punishment" of sin. The Sacrament of Penance removes this guilt and the liability of eternal punishment related to mortal sin.

The forgiveness of sin and restoration of communion with God entail the remission of the eternal punishment of sin, but the temporal punishment of sin remains. An example of this can be seen in 2 Samuel 12, when, after David repents of his sin, the prophet Nathan tells him that he is forgiven, but, "Thus says the Lord God of Israel:...Now, therefore, the sword shall never depart from your house, because you have despised me and have taken the wife of Uriah to be your wife."

In addition to the eternal punishment due to mortal sin, every sin, including venial sin, is a turning away from God through what the Catechism of the Catholic Church calls an 'unhealthy attachment to creatures', an attachment that must be purified either here on earth, or after death in the state called purgatory. "The process of sanctification and interior renewal requires not only forgiveness from the guilt (culpa) of sin, but also purification from the harmful effects or wounds of sin." This purification process gives rise to "temporal punishment", because, not involving a total rejection of God, it is not eternal and can be expiated. Catholic teaching states that the temporal punishment of sin should be accepted as a grace, and that the sinner "should strive by works of mercy and charity, as well as by prayer and the various practices of penance, to put off completely the 'old man' and to put on the 'new man."

The temporal punishment that follows sin is thus undergone either during life on earth or in purgatory. In this life, as well as by patient acceptance of sufferings and trials, the necessary cleansing from attachment to creatures may, at least in part, be achieved by turning to God in prayer and penance and by works of mercy and charity. Indulgences (from the Latin verb , meaning "to forgive", "to be lenient toward") are a help towards achieving this purification.

An indulgence does not forgive the guilt of sin, nor does it provide release from the eternal punishment associated with unforgiven mortal sins. The Catholic Church teaches that indulgences relieve only the temporal punishment resulting from the effect of sin (the effect of rejecting God the source of good), and that a person is still required to have their grave sins absolved, ordinarily through the sacrament of Confession, to receive salvation. Similarly, an indulgence is not a permit to commit sin, a pardon of future sin, nor a guarantee of salvation for oneself or for another. Ordinarily, forgiveness of mortal sins is obtained through Confession (also known as the sacrament of penance or reconciliation).

According to the Catechism of the Catholic Church, "The 'treasury of the Church' is the infinite value, which can never be exhausted, which Christ's merits have before God. They were offered so that the whole of mankind could be set free from sin and attain communion with the Father. ... In Christ, the Redeemer himself, the satisfactions and merits of his Redemption exist and find their efficacy. ...This treasury includes as well the prayers and good works of the Blessed Virgin Mary. They are truly immense, unfathomable, and even pristine in their value before God. In the treasury, too, are the prayers and good works of all the saints, all those who have followed in the footsteps of Christ the Lord and by his grace have made their lives holy and carried out the mission in the unity of the Mystical Body."

Pursuant to the church's understanding of the power of binding or loosing granted by Christ, it administers to those under its jurisdiction the benefits of these merits in consideration of prayer or other pious works undertaken by the faithful. In opening for individual Christians its treasury, "the Church does not want simply to come to the aid of these Christians, but also to spur them to works of devotion, penance, and charity".

Consistent with this, Peter J. Beer, SJ, writes in Theological Studies:

Dispositions necessary to gain an indulgence
An indulgence is not the purchase of a pardon which secures the buyer's salvation or releases the soul of another from purgatory. Sin is only pardoned (i.e., its effects entirely obliterated) when complete reparation in the form of sacramental confession is made and prescribed conditions are followed. After a firm amendment is made internally not to sin again, and the serious execution of one's assigned penance, the release of one from penalty in the spiritual sense consequentially follows.

An indulgence may be plenary (remits all temporal punishment required to cleanse the soul from attachment to anything but God) or partial (remits only part of the temporal punishment, i.e. cleansing, due to sin).

To gain a plenary indulgence, upon performing the charitable work or praying the aspiration or prayer for which the indulgence is granted, one must fulfill the prescribed conditions of:
 A complete and whole-hearted detachment from all sin of any kind, even venial sin
 Making a valid sacramental confession 
 Receiving Holy Communion in the state of grace
 Praying for the intentions of the Pope.

The minimum condition for gaining a partial indulgence is to be contrite in heart; on this condition, a Catholic who performs the work or recites the prayer in question is granted, through the church, remission of temporal punishment equal to that obtained by the person's own action.

Since those who have died in the state of grace (with all mortal sins forgiven) are members of the communion of saints, the living (members of the Church Militant) can assist those whose purification from their sins was not yet completed at the time of death through prayer but also by obtaining indulgences in their behalf. Since the church has no jurisdiction over the dead, indulgences can be gained for them only , i.e. by an act of intercession. This is sometimes termed 'impetration', which Aquinas explains "...is not founded on God's justice, but on His goodness".

Present discipline 

By the apostolic constitution  of 1 January 1967, Pope Paul VI, responding to suggestions made at the Second Vatican Council, substantially revised the practical application of the traditional doctrine.

Paul VI made it clear that the Catholic Church's aim was not merely to help the faithful make due satisfaction for their sins, but chiefly to bring them to greater fervour of charity. For this purpose he decreed that partial indulgences, previously granted as the equivalent of a certain number of days, months, quarantines (forty-day periods) or years of canonical penance, simply supplement, and to the same degree, the remission that those performing the indulgenced action already gain by the charity and contrition with which they do it.

The abolition of the classification by years and days made it clearer than before that repentance and faith are required not only for remission of eternal punishment for mortal sin but also for remission of temporal punishment for sin. In , Pope Paul VI wrote that indulgences cannot be gained without a sincere conversion of outlook and unity with God.

In the same bill, Pope Paul ordered that the official list of indulgenced prayers and good works, called the Raccolta, be revised "with a view to attaching indulgences only to the most important prayers and works of piety, charity and penance". While a number of indulgenced prayers and good works were removed from the list, it now includes new general grants of partial indulgences that apply to a wide range of prayerful actions, and it indicates that the prayers that it does list as deserving veneration on account of divine inspiration or antiquity or as being in widespread use are only examples of those to which the first of these general grants applies: "Raising the mind to God with humble trust while performing one's duties and bearing life's difficulties, and adding, at least mentally, some pious invocation".

Canons 992-997 of the 1983 Code of Canon Law provide a general regulation of indulgences.

Actions for which indulgences are granted

Partial indulgences
There are four general grants of indulgence, which are meant to encourage the faithful to infuse a Christian spirit into the actions of their daily lives and to strive for perfection of charity. These indulgences are partial, and their worth therefore depends on the fervour with which the person performs the recommended actions:
 Raising the mind to God with humble trust while performing one's duties and bearing life's difficulties, and adding, at least mentally, some pious invocation.
 Devoting oneself or one's goods compassionately in a spirit of faith to the service of one's brothers and sisters in need.
 Freely abstaining in a spirit of penance from something licit and pleasant.
 Freely giving open witness to one's faith before others in particular circumstances of everyday life.

According to the 1968 Enchiridion of Indulgences, a partial indulgence is granted from the following actions:
 making an act of faith, hope, charity, contrition, or spiritual communion
 praying the Hidden God (Adoro te devote), To you O blessed Joseph (Ad te beate Ioseph), certain Roman Breviary prayers (We Give You Thanks, Lord God Almighty, Let us pray for our Sovereign Pontiff, O Sacred Banquet, Holy Mary help of the helpless, Holy Apostles Peter and Paul, Visit We Beg You O Lord), Angel of God, Angel of the Lord, Soul of Christ (Anima Christi), Hear Us (Roman Ritual), May it Please you O Lord, Eternal Rest, Hail Holy Queen, We Fly To Your Patronage, or Come Holy Spirit
 praying the Litany of Name of Jesus, Heart of Jesus, Blood of Jesus, Virgin Mary, Saint Joseph, or All Saints
 praying the Little Office of the Passion, Heart of Jesus, Immaculate Conception, or Saint Joseph
 reciting the Apostles' Creed, Nicene Creed, Lauds or Vespers of the Office of the Dead, Psalm 50, Psalm 129, Magnificat, or Memorare (Remember O Most gracious Virgin Mary)
 teaching or learning Christian doctrine
 visiting a Christian catacomb
 praying for sacerdotal or religious vocations
 praying for the unity of the Church
 spending some time in mental prayer
 making the Sign of the Cross
 renewal of baptismal promises

Plenary indulgences
Among the particular grants, which, on closer inspection, will be seen to be included in one or more of the four general grants, especially the first, the  draws special attention to four activities for which a plenary indulgence can be gained on any day, though only once a day:
 Piously reading or listening to Sacred Scripture for at least half an hour.
 Adoration of Jesus in the Eucharist for at least half an hour.
 The pious exercise of the Stations of the Cross.
 Recitation of the Rosary or the Akathist in a church or oratory, or in a family, a religious community, an association of the faithful and, in general, when several people come together for an honourable purpose.

Besides the above actions, the 1968 Enchiridion of Indulgences lists the following actions as granting a plenary indulgence:
 First Communion
 first Mass of a newly ordained priest

Special indulgences
A plenary indulgence may also be gained on some occasions, which are not everyday occurrences. They include but are not limited to:
 Receiving, even by radio or television, the blessing given by the Pope  ('to the city [of Rome] and to the world') or that which a bishop is authorized to give three times a year to the faithful of his diocese.
 Taking part devoutly in the celebration of a day devoted on a world level to a particular religious purpose. Under this heading come the annual celebrations such as the World Day of Prayer for Vocations, and occasional celebrations such as World Youth Day.
Taking part for at least three full days in a spiritual retreat.
Taking part in some functions during the Week of Prayer for Christian Unity.

Special indulgences are also granted on occasions of particular spiritual significance such as a jubilee year or the centenary or similar anniversary of an event such as the apparition of Our Lady of Lourdes.

Apostolic Blessing
Of particular significance is the plenary indulgence attached to the Apostolic Blessing that a priest is to impart when giving the sacraments to a person in danger of death, and which, if no priest is available, the church grants to any rightly disposed Christian at the moment of death, on condition that that person was accustomed to say some prayers during life. In this case the church itself makes up for the three conditions normally required for a plenary indulgence: sacramental confession, Eucharistic communion and prayer for the Pope's intentions.

Coronavirus plenary indulgences

On 20 March 2020, the Apostolic Penitentiary issued three plenary indulgences. 
 The first indulgence was for victims of COVID-19 and those helping them. The actions that the indulgence was attached to included praying the rosary, the Stations of the Cross, or at least praying the Creed, Lord's Prayer, and a Marian prayer. 
The second plenary indulgence was for the victims of COVID-19 at their hour of death.
The third indulgence was for those who made an offering for an "end of the epidemic, relief for those who are afflicted and eternal salvation for those whom the Lord has called to Himself." The offering was either a visit to the Eucharist, Eucharistic adoration, Rosary, Stations of the Cross, Chaplet of the Divine Mercy, or reading the Bible for half an hour. 
The Penitentiary took the extraordinary step of loosening the requirements regarding sacramental Communion and Confession, due to the impossibility of carrying them out in a timely fashion during lockdowns and suspension of liturgies in the pandemic. The Vatican has also reminded Catholics that, in cases where sacramental confession is impossible, an act of perfect contrition grants one forgiveness of sin.

History

Early and medieval beliefs
In the early church, especially from the third century on, ecclesiastic authorities allowed a confessor or a Christian awaiting martyrdom to intercede for another Christian in order to shorten the other's canonical penance.
During the Decian persecution, many Christians obtained signed statements certifying that they had sacrificed to the Roman gods in order to avoid persecution or confiscation of property. When these lapsi later wished to once again be admitted to the Christian community, some of the lapsi presented a second  purported to bear the signature of some martyr or confessor who, it was held, had the spiritual prestige to reaffirm individual Christians. Bishop Cyprian of Carthage insisted that none of the lapsi be admitted without sincere repentance.

The Council of Epaone in 517 witnesses to the rise of the practice of replacing severe canonical penances with a new milder penance: its 29th canon reduced to two years the penance that apostates were to undergo on their return to the church, but obliged them to fast one day in three during those two years, to come to church and take their place at the penitents' door, and to leave with the catechumens. Any who objected to the new arrangement was to observe the much longer ancient penance.

The 6th century saw the development in Ireland of Penitentials, handbooks for confessors in assigning penance. The Penitential of Cummean counseled a priest to take into consideration in imposing a penance, the penitent's strengths and weaknesses. Some penances could be commuted through payments or substitutions. It became customary to commute penances to less demanding works, such as prayers, alms, fasts and even the payment of fixed sums of money depending on the various kinds of offenses (tariff penances). While the sanctions in early penitentials, such as that of Gildas, were primarily acts of mortification or in some cases excommunication, the inclusion of fines in later compilations derive from secular law.

By the 10th century, some penances were not replaced but merely reduced in connection with pious donations, pilgrimages, and similar meritorious works. Then, in the 11th and 12th centuries, the recognition of the value of these works began to become associated not so much with canonical penance but with remission of the temporal punishment due to sin. A particular form of the commutation of penance was practiced at the time of the Crusades when the confessor required the penitent to go on a Crusade in place of some other penance. The earliest record of a plenary indulgence was Pope Urban II's declaration at the Council of Clermont (1095) that he remitted all penance incurred by crusaders who had confessed their sins in the Sacrament of Penance, considering participation in the crusade equivalent to a complete penance. This set the pattern for all crusade indulgences going forward.

Theologians looked to God's mercy, the value of the church's prayers, and the merits of the saints as the basis on which indulgences could be granted. Around 1230 the Dominican Hugh of St-Cher proposed the idea of a "treasury" at the church's disposal, consisting of the infinite merits of Christ and the immeasurable abundance of the saints' merits, a thesis that was demonstrated by great scholastics such as Albertus Magnus and Thomas Aquinas and remains the basis for the theological explanation of indulgences.

Indulgences were intended to offer remission of the temporal punishment due to sin equivalent to that someone might obtain by performing a canonical penance for a specific period of time. As Purgatory became more prominent in Christian thinking, the idea developed that the term of indulgences related to remission of time in Purgatory. Indeed, many Late Medieval indulgences were for terms well over a human lifetime, reflecting this belief. For several centuries it was debated by theologians whether penance or purgatory was the currency of the indulgences granted, and the church did not settle the matter definitively, for example avoiding doing so at the Council of Trent. The modern view of the church is that the term is penance.

Late Medieval usage

Indulgences became increasingly popular in the Middle Ages as a reward for displaying piety and doing good deeds, though, doctrinally speaking, the Catholic Church stated that the indulgence was only valid for temporal punishment for sins already forgiven in the Sacrament of Confession. The faithful asked that indulgences be given for saying their favourite prayers, doing acts of devotion, attending places of worship, and going on pilgrimage; confraternities wanted indulgences for putting on performances and processions; associations demanded that their meetings be rewarded with indulgences. Good deeds included charitable donations of money for a good cause, and money thus raised was used for many causes, both religious and civil; building projects funded by indulgences include churches, hospitals, leper colonies, schools, roads, and bridges.

However, in the later Middle Ages growth of considerable abuses occurred. Some commissaries sought to extract the maximum amount of money for each indulgence. Professional "pardoners" ( in Latin) - who were sent to collect alms for a specific project - practiced the unrestricted sale of indulgences. Many of these  exceeded official church doctrine, and promised rewards such as salvation from eternal damnation in return for money. With the permission of the church, indulgences also became a way for Catholic rulers to fund expensive projects, such as Crusades and cathedrals, by keeping a significant portion of the money raised from indulgences in their lands. There was a tendency to forge documents declaring that indulgences had been granted. Indulgences grew to extraordinary magnitude, in terms of longevity and breadth of forgiveness.

The Fourth Lateran Council (1215) suppressed some abuses connected with indulgences, spelling out, for example, that only a one-year indulgence would be granted for the consecration of churches and no more than a 40-days indulgence for other occasions. The Council also stated that "Catholics who have girded themselves with the cross for the extermination of the heretics, shall enjoy the indulgences and privileges granted to those who go in defense of the Holy Land."

Very soon these limits were widely exceeded. False documents were circulated with indulgences surpassing all bounds: indulgences of hundreds or even thousands of years. In 1392, more than a century before Martin Luther published the Ninety-five Theses, Pope Boniface IX wrote to the Bishop of Ferrara condemning the practice of certain members of religious orders who falsely claimed that they were authorized by the pope to forgive all sorts of sins, and obtained money from the simple-minded faithful by promising them perpetual happiness in this world and eternal glory in the next. The "Butter Tower" of Rouen Cathedral earned its nickname because the money to build it was raised by the sale of indulgences allowing the use of butter during Lent.

An engraving by Israhel van Meckenem of the Mass of Saint Gregory contained a "bootlegged" indulgence of 20,000 years; one of the copies of this plate (not the one illustrated, but also from the 1490s) was altered in a later state to increase it to 45,000 years. The indulgences applied each time a specified collection of prayers - in this case seven each of the Creed, Our Father, and Hail Mary - were recited in front of the image.

Protestant Reformation

The scandalous conduct of the "pardoners" was an immediate occasion of the Protestant Reformation. In 1517, Pope Leo X offered indulgences for those who gave alms to rebuild St. Peter's Basilica in Rome. The aggressive marketing practices of Johann Tetzel in promoting this cause provoked Martin Luther to write his Ninety-five Theses, condemning what he saw as the purchase and sale of salvation. In Thesis 28 Luther objected to a saying attributed to Tetzel: "As soon as a coin in the coffer rings, a soul from purgatory springs". The Ninety-five Theses not only denounced such transactions as worldly but denied the pope's right to grant pardons on God's behalf in the first place: the only thing indulgences guaranteed, Luther said, was an increase in profit and greed, because the pardon of the church was in God's power alone.

This oft-quoted saying was by no means representative of the official Catholic teaching on indulgences, but rather, more a reflection of Tetzel's capacity to exaggerate. Yet if Tetzel overstated the matter in regard to indulgences for the dead, his teaching on indulgences for the living was pure. A German Catholic historian of the Papacy, Ludwig von Pastor, explains:

While Luther did not deny the pope's right to grant pardons for penance imposed by the church, he made it clear that preachers who claimed indulgences absolved those who obtained them from all punishments and granted them salvation were in error, in agreement with Catholic theology.

Erasmus also criticized the abuse of indulgences in his foreword to his  (1530), where he stated that it appeared to be "nothing but a commercial transaction" and described how the money that was collected disappeared in the hands of princes, officials, commissaries, and confessors.

Council of Trent
Then on 4 December 1563, in its final session, the Council addressed the question of indulgences directly, declaring them "most salutary for the Christian people", decreeing that "all evil gains for the obtaining of them be wholly abolished", and instructing bishops to be on the watch for any abuses concerning them.

A few years later, in 1567, Pope Pius V canceled all grants of indulgences involving any fees or other financial transactions.

After the Council of Trent, Clement VIII established a commission of Cardinals to deal with indulgences according to the mind of the Council. It continued its work during the pontificate of Paul V and published various bulls and decrees on the matter. However, only Clement IX established a true Congregation of Indulgences (and Relics) with a Brief of 6 July 1669.

Eastern Orthodox Church

The Eastern Orthodox Churches believe one can be absolved from sins by the Sacred Mystery of Confession. Because of differences in the theology of salvation, indulgences for the remission of temporal punishment of sin do not exist in Eastern Orthodoxy, but until the twentieth century there existed in some places a practice of absolution certificates ( – ).

Some of these certificates were connected with any patriarch's decrees lifting some serious ecclesiastical penalty, including excommunication, for the living or the dead. However, because of the expense of maintaining the Holy Places and paying the many taxes levied on them, the Greek Orthodox Patriarch of Jerusalem, with the approval of the Ecumenical Patriarch of Constantinople, had the sole privilege of distributing such documents in large numbers to pilgrims or sending them elsewhere, sometimes with a blank space for the name of the beneficiary, living or dead, an individual or a whole family, for whom the prayers would be read.

Greek Orthodox Patriarch of Jerusalem Dositheos Notaras (1641–1707) wrote: "It is an established custom and ancient tradition, known to all, that the Most Holy Patriarchs give the absolution certificate ( – ) to the faithful people … they have granted them from the beginning and still do."

Starting from the 16th century, Orthodox Christians of the Greek Church rather extensively, although not officially in penitential practice, used "permissive letters", in many ways similar to indulgences. The status of an official ecclesiastical document is obtained at the Council of Constantinople in 1727, the resolution of which reads: "The power of the abandonment of sins, which, if filed in writing, which the Eastern Church of Christ calls "permissive letters", and the Latin people "indulgences"... is given by Christ in the holy Church. These "permissive letters" are issued throughout the catholic (universal) Church by the four holiest patriarchs: Constantinople, Alexandria, Antioch, and Jerusalem." From XIII to XVII century, it was used in Russia. Indulgences as a means of enrichment were condemned at the Council of Constantinople in 1838. Even conciliar decisions had difficulty eradicating the practice of indulgences, rooted in the people. "Permissive letters" (or indulgences) survived in Greece until the mid-20th century.

See also
 Pardon of Assisi
 Merit
 Simony

References

Citations

Sources 

 
 Lea, Henry Charles, A History of Auricular Confession and Indulgences in the Latin Church, 1896, Lea Bros., Philadelphia, Online at archive.org
 Parshall, Peter, in David Landau & Peter Parshall, The Renaissance Print, Yale, 1996, 
 Shestack, Alan; Fifteenth Century Engravings of Northern Europe; 1967, National Gallery of Art, Washington (Catalogue), LOC 67-29080

Further reading
 Sacred Apostolic Penitentiary (Vatican); Enchiridion of Indulgences: Norms and Grants, trans. by William T. Barry from the Second Rev. Ed. of the Enchiridion indulgentiarum ... with English Supplement; 1969, Catholic Book Publishing Co. N.B.: "Originally published by Libreria Editrice Vaticana, 1968." Without ISBN.
 Peters, Edward. A Modern Guide to Indulgences: Rediscovering This Often Misinterpreted Teaching, Hillenbrand Books, Mundelein, Illinois, 2008. 
 Indulgenced prayers in With God, by Francis Xavier Lasance, New York: Benziger Brothers  (1911)

External links

Indulgence sales in the Middle Ages (Confessional Lutheran perspective)
Pope John Paul II: General Audience talk on indulgences, 29 September 1999
The Gift of the Indulgence: Cardinal William Wakefield Baum
The Historical Origin of Indulgences
Myths about Indulgences
Code of Canon Law (1983) concerning Indulgences
Enchiridion Indulgentiarum, 4th edition, 1999 (Latin) (English translation: Manual of Indulgences, published by the United States Conference of Catholic Bishops)
English translation of Enchiridion Indulgentiarum, 3rd edition (1986).

Confession (religion)
16th-century Christianity
Catholic theology and doctrine
Christian terminology
Catholic Church and finance